Russell Neville Pery (born 13 March 1938), also known as Neville Russell Pery or Russell Perry, is an Australian weightlifter. He competed in the 1960 Summer Olympics in the lightweight division and in the 1968 Summer Olympics in the light heavyweight division. He is from Townsville in Queensland.

References

External links 
 
 

1938 births
Living people
Australian male weightlifters
Olympic weightlifters of Australia
Weightlifters at the 1960 Summer Olympics
Weightlifters at the 1968 Summer Olympics
People from Townsville
Commonwealth Games medallists in weightlifting
Commonwealth Games gold medallists for Australia
Commonwealth Games bronze medallists for Australia
Weightlifters at the 1966 British Empire and Commonwealth Games
Weightlifters at the 1970 British Commonwealth Games
Medallists at the 1966 British Empire and Commonwealth Games
Medallists at the 1970 British Commonwealth Games